The 2023 Iowa State Cyclones football team will represent Iowa State University in the Big 12 Conference during the 2023 NCAA Division I FBS football season. The Cyclones are expected to be led by Matt Campbell in his eighth year as their head coach.

They played their home games at Jack Trice Stadium in Ames, Iowa.

Schedule

References

Iowa State
Iowa State Cyclones football seasons
Iowa State Cyclones football